Dolšce (in older sources also Dolšice) is a settlement in the Municipality of Kostanjevica na Krki in eastern Slovenia. It lies in the foothills of the Gorjanci Hills, south of the town of Kostanjevica na Krki. The area is part of the traditional region of Lower Carniola. It is now included in the Lower Sava Statistical Region.

Name
The name of the settlement was changed from Dolšče  to Dolšce in 1990.

References

External links
Dolšce on Geopedia

Populated places in the Municipality of Kostanjevica na Krki